Eleşkirt District is a district of Ağrı Province of Turkey. Its seat is the town Eleşkirt. Its area is 1,307 km2, and its population is 31,545 (2021).

Composition
There are four municipalities in Eleşkirt District:
 Eleşkirt
 Tahir
 Yayladüzü
 Yücekapı

There are 55 villages in Eleşkirt District:

 Abdiköy
 Akyumak
 Alagün
 Alkuşak
 Arifbey
 Aşağıkopuz
 Aydoğdu
 Çatalpınar
 Çatkösedağ
 Çetinsu
 Çiftepınar
 Dalkılıç
 Değirmenoluğu
 Dolutaş
 Düzağıl
 Düzyayla
 Ergözü
 Goncalı
 Gözaydın
 Güneykaya
 Güvence
 Hasanpınarı
 Haydaroğlu
 Hayrangöl
 Hürriyet
 Ikizgeçe
 Ikizgöl
 Indere
 Kanatgeren
 Karabacak
 Kayayolu
 Kokulupınar
 Körpeçayır
 Mollahüseyin
 Mollasüleyman
 Öztoprak
 Palakçayırı
 Pirabat
 Ramazan
 Sadaklı
 Salkımlı
 Sarıköy
 Söbetaş
 Sultanabat
 Süzgeçli
 Toprakkale
 Türkeli
 Uludal
 Uzunyazı
 Yağmurlu
 Yanıkdere
 Yelkesen
 Yeşilova
 Yığıntaş
 Yukarıkopuz

References

Districts of Ağrı Province